Arena Egnatia is a multi-purpose stadium in Rrogozhinë, Albania. It is used for football matches and is the home ground of Egnatia. Its capacity is 4,000 spectators, 1,200 of which are seated.

References

Football venues in Albania
Multi-purpose stadiums in Albania
Buildings and structures in Tirana County
KF Egnatia